Giampaolo Tronchin (10 December 1940 – 27 November 2021) was an Italian rower. He competed in the men's coxed pair event at the 1972 Summer Olympics. Tronchin died on 27 November 2021, at the age of 80.

References

External links
 

1940 births
2021 deaths
Italian male rowers
Olympic rowers of Italy
Rowers at the 1972 Summer Olympics
Sportspeople from the Province of Treviso